The following is a list of the highest goalscorers in Liga Nacional de Fútbol de Honduras' history

List of goalscorers
 From 2012–13 the total of goals added from Apertura and Clausura tournaments to define one goalscorer.

By club

See also

References

Goalscorers
Honduras